Jean Masson (8 September 1907, Bayon, Meurthe-et-Moselle – 10 August 1964) was a French politician who served as state secretary in various governments during the French Fourth Republic, Minister of Youth Affairs and Sports in 1952–53.

References

1907 births
1964 deaths
People from Meurthe-et-Moselle
Politicians from Grand Est
Radical Party (France) politicians
French Ministers of Veterans Affairs
Members of the Constituent Assembly of France (1946)
Deputies of the 1st National Assembly of the French Fourth Republic
Deputies of the 2nd National Assembly of the French Fourth Republic
Deputies of the 3rd National Assembly of the French Fourth Republic
French people of the Algerian War